Robert Bretscher (born 6 August 1953) is a Swiss gymnast. He competed at the 1972 Summer Olympics and the 1976 Summer Olympics.

References

1953 births
Living people
Swiss male artistic gymnasts
Olympic gymnasts of Switzerland
Gymnasts at the 1972 Summer Olympics
Gymnasts at the 1976 Summer Olympics
Place of birth missing (living people)